Le Tonnelier de Breteuil was a French surname, held by:
 Louis Nicolas Le Tonnelier de Breteuil (1648–1728), officer of the household of Louis XIV
 François Victor Le Tonnelier de Breteuil (1686–1743), twice secretary of state for war
 Gabrielle Émilie Le Tonnelier de Breteuil (1706–1749), mathematician, daughter of Louis Nicolas
 Louis Auguste Le Tonnelier de Breteuil (1730–1807), diplomat and politician